Berthoud Falls is a populated place located south of Berthoud Pass on U.S. Highway 40 in north-central Colorado. The elevation is 9,800 feet.

References 

Landforms of Clear Creek County, Colorado
Unincorporated communities in Colorado